Paulatuk is a hamlet located in the Inuvik Region of the Northwest Territories, Canada. It is located adjacent to Darnley Bay, in the Amundsen Gulf. The town was named for the coal that was found in the area in the 1920s, and the Siglitun spelling is Paulatuuq, "place of coal".

The area has been inhabited by humans, including the Thule and Copper Inuit, since roughly 1000 CE. Most recently, it is part of the Inuvialuit Settlement Region. Paulatuk was incorporated as a hamlet in 1987 and celebrated the 50th anniversary of its settlement in 2015.

Demographics

In the 2016 census 235 people were listed as Indigenous and all were Inuit (Inuvialuit). The two principal languages spoken in Paulatuk are Inuinnaqtun (Inuvialuktun) and English.

Community

European settlement began when the Roman Catholic Church opened a trading post. The trading post was taken over by the local co-op and today the local store is part of The North West Company.

Hunting, fishing and trapping are major economic activities, but in recent years art printmaking has played an increasing role in the local economy.

So the buffer effect has completely disappeared. Located to the east of the community is Tuktut Nogait National Park and Parks Canada has an office in the community.

Notable residents

Artists
Paulatuk's Inuit artists are known across Canada and around the world for dance, music, sculptures, prints, and drawings.

Floyd Kuptana
Floyd Kuptana was born in 1964. He studied under David Ruben Piqtoukun and began solo work in 1992. He is a carver, sculptor, and painter.

Robert Kuptana
Robert Kuptana was born in 1962. A carver since his youth, he studied under his brother Floyd and began professional work in 1998.

The Paulatuk Moonlight Dancers
The Paulatuk Moonlight Dancers are a group of traditional Inuvialuit dancers. They have performed in Canada, the United States, Greenland, and Germany, and are led by Michael “Nolan” Green. Green also served as a hamlet councillor and received a Canada Youth Award in 2002.

Abraham Anghik Ruben
Abraham Anghik Ruben was born south of Paulatuk in 1951 and lived on the land with his family until he was eight years old. He currently lives on Salt Spring Island.

His 2001 sculpture The Last Goodbye reflects Ruben and his brothers' experiences of being separated from their family by Canada's residential school system. Ruben writes,

Abraham Anghik Ruben became an Officer in the Order of Canada on November 17, 2016 for his artistic contributions as a sculptor and for his preservation of northern heritage.

David Ruben Piqtoukun
David Ruben Piqtoukun was born in Paulatuk in 1950. A sculptor and print artist, he is also brother to Abraham Anghik Ruben and was a mentor to Floyd Kuptana.

Mayors
A mayor has led the hamlet since its incorporation in 1987, when the first mayor, Garrett Ruben, was elected. Ruben was also a community leader before incorporation. As a young man he worked near the Distant Early Warning (DEW) Line site at Cape Parry, but the area was isolated and far from traditional hunting grounds. After leaving this work, he negotiated for the community locally and in the south and became Settlement Chair prior to serving as mayor. Ruben died in 2007 at the age of 72. The hamlet has formally recognized him for his 24 years of service. Ray Ruben, the sixth and current mayor, is his son.

Other figures

Anny Illasiak
Paulatuk elder Anny Illasiak, also known as Granny Uma, died in 2012 at the age of 74. A resident of Paulatuk since the 1970s, Illasiak was a leader in training children and young people to live on the land. She also organized a community sewing group, teaching others to make traditional clothing and creating tapestries herself, and volunteered as a cook with the Paulatuk Community Kitchen. She served as the Aboriginal language teacher for the Paulatuk Aboriginal Headstart Program for 10 years and continued to assist with the program after her retirement.

Elizabeth Kuptana
Elizabeth "Liz" Kuptana, recipient of the Wallace Goose Award (given to those who have “shown beyond a shadow of a doubt, that he or she has unselfishly dedicated time, effort, and sometimes blood, sweat, and tears for the advancement and benefit of all Inuvialuit”) is a Paulatuk elder, teacher, and storyteller. She teaches children and youth about Inuvialuit culture and language as well as the history of the Inuvialuit Final Agreement. She was awarded the Queen Elizabeth II Diamond Jubilee Medal in 2013.

The Paulatuuq Oral History Project
Paulatuuq Oral History Project: Elders Share Their Stories was published in 2004. Eight community elders, including Edward Ruben and Mary Evik Ruben, contributed to this record of the hamlet's oral history, completing interviews transcribed by Cathy Cockney.

Services
Services include a two-member Royal Canadian Mounted Police detachment and a health centre with two nurses. Phone services are provided by Northwestel with Internet by SSI Micro and their AirWare service.

The community is part of the Beaufort Delta Education Council and schooling is available up to Grade 12 at the Angik School. There is also a community learning centre operated by Aurora College.

The community is not accessible by road but there is an airport, Paulatuk (Nora Aliqatchialuk Ruben) Airport, and flights into the community are provided by Aklak Air from Inuvik three times a week. In the summer floatplanes can use the Paulatuk Water Aerodrome and an annual sealift is provided by Northern Transportation Company Limited from Hay River.

Climate
Paulatuk has a subarctic climate (Dfc), narrowly avoiding being a tundra climate (ET) due to July having an average temperature above . Rainfall is in limited amounts and confined to the months of June - September because all other months don't have an average temperature above freezing, which would be warm enough for rain.

See also
 List of municipalities in the Northwest Territories

References

Communities in the Inuvik Region
Populated places in Arctic Canada
Hudson's Bay Company trading posts
Hamlets in the Northwest Territories
Inuvialuit communities
Inuit in the Northwest Territories
Road-inaccessible communities of the Northwest Territories
Oral history